The Carlos Palanca Memorial Awards for Literature winners in the year 1953 (rank, title of winning entry, name of author).


English division

Short story
First prize: "The Quarrel" by Andres Cristobal Cruz
Second prize: "Lupo and the River" by N.V.M. Gonzales
Third prize: "The Centipede" by Rony V. Diaz

Filipino (Tagalog) division

Short story
First prize: "Kapangyarihan" by Buenaventura S. Medina Jr.
Second prize: "Ang Anluwage" by Hilario Coronel
Third prize: "Malalim ang Gabi" by Ponciano B. Pineda

More winners by year

References
 

Palanca Awards
1953 literary awards